The 1904 Prince Edward Island general election was held in the Canadian province of Prince Edward Island on December 7, 1904.

The election was won by the governing Liberals, led by incumbent Premier Arthur Peters. Peters' own election in the district of 2nd Kings was almost in doubt, due to a tie vote of 515 votes each for him and his Conservative opponent; following a judicial recount, a by-election was held where Peters was acclaimed as the district's Assemblyman.

Peters died in January 1908, and was succeeded as Premier by Francis Haszard.

The opposition Conservatives, led by John A. Mathieson, lost one seat.

One of the two members from each constituency is styled a Councillor, and the other an Assemblyman. In electoral contests Councillor candidates runs against Councillor candidates; Assemblyman candidates against Assemblyman candidates.

Party Standings

Members Elected

The Legislature of Prince Edward Island had two levels of membership from 1893 to 1996 - Assemblymen and Councillors. This was a holdover from when the Island had a bicameral legislature, the General Assembly and the Legislative Council.

In 1893, the Legislative Council was abolished and had its membership merged with the Assembly, though the two titles remained separate and were elected by different electoral franchises. Assembleymen were elected by all eligible voters of within a district, while Councillors were only elected by landowners within a district.

Kings

Prince

Queens

Sources

Further reading
 

1904 elections in Canada
Elections in Prince Edward Island
1904 in Prince Edward Island
December 1904 events